Air Marshal Sir Graham Anthony "Dusty" Miller,  (born 31 October 1951) is a retired senior Royal Air Force officer.

RAF career
Miller joined the RAF as a craft apprentice in 210th entry, No. 1 School of Technical Training, RAF Halton in 1967. In 1969 he qualified as a junior technician at RAF Halton and was commissioned as an acting pilot officer on 2 January 1970 together with fellow member of 210th entry craft apprentices, Junior Technician Michael David James King. He was appointed Air Officer Commanding Training Group in 2002, Air Secretary in 2003 and Deputy Commander at Joint Force Command in Naples in 2004 before retiring on 31 January 2008. In 2002, he was appointed a Commander of the Order of the British Empire for his service in Saudi Arabia, and upgraded to a Knight Commander of the Order of the British Empire in the 2007 New Year Honours.

He now flies as a RAFVR(T) officer with the Air Experience Flight at RAF Cosford.

Miller was elected national President of the Royal Air Forces Association at the RAF Association's Annual Conference in Eastbourne on 15 May 2011. He was congratulated by the outgoing President, Air Marshal Philip Sturley.

Other roles

Miller served as the High Sheriff of Gloucestershire for 2022-23, and in that role read the Proclamation of accession of Charles III outside the Shire Hall, Gloucester, on 11 September 2022.

References

|-

1951 births
Knights Commander of the Order of the British Empire
Living people
Royal Air Force air marshals
Royal Air Force personnel of the War in Afghanistan (2001–2021)
Trenchard Brats